Ahmet Adnan Saygun (7 September 1907 – 6 January 1991) was a Turkish composer, musicologist and writer on music.

One of a group of composers known as the Turkish Five who pioneered western classical music in Turkey, his works show a mastery of Western musical practice, while also incorporating traditional Turkish folk songs and culture. When alluding to folk elements he tends to spotlight one note of the scale and weave a melody around it, based on a Turkish mode. His extensive output includes five symphonies, five operas, two piano concertos, concertos for violin, viola and cello, and a wide range of chamber and choral works.

The Times called him "the grand old man of Turkish music, who was to his country what Jean Sibelius is to Finland, what Manuel de Falla is to Spain, and what Béla Bartók is to Hungary". Saygun was growing up in Turkey when he witnessed radical changes in his country’s politics and culture as the reforms of Mustafa Kemal Atatürk had replaced the Ottoman Empire—which had ruled for nearly 600 years—with a new secular republic based on Western models and traditions. As Atatürk had created a new cultural identity for his people and newly founded nation, Saygun found his role in developing what Atatürk had begun.

Biography

Ahmet Adnan Saygun was born in 1907 in İzmir, then part of the Ottoman Empire – in today's Turkey. There were frequent concerts given by the Ottoman military bands, and performances of Western works by chamber music ensembles at the time and this influenced Saygun to start his first music lessons in elementary school. He started playing the piano, the Ottoman short-necked lute and the oud at an early age and quickly found his passion writing music at the age of fourteen. His father who was a mathematics teacher and scholar of religions and literature taught him English and French as well as world religions at an early age. Through rigorous study Saygun was able to translate the music section of the French Grande Encyclopédie into a music encyclopedia in Turkish. While in high school, he continued his music lessons with lessons in school as well as from a private teacher and through a theory book which he was given at an early age. In 1926, only two years after his graduation from high school he was appointed as teacher of music at a high school in his native city of İzmir.

In 1928 he was recognized nationally and received a grant to study in France by the Turkish state. He attended the Schola Cantorum de Paris where he studied composition with Vincent d'Indy, theory  and counterpoint with Eugène Borrel, organ with Édouard Souberbielle and Gregorian chant with Amédée Gastoué. He was further introduced to late-romantic music and French impressionism. During this time his imagination flourished, enabling him to write his first large work for orchestra: Divertimento. This piece won him an award in 1931 in Paris and was performed with great success the same year in Poland and former USSR. In 1931 he returned to Turkey as a music teacher for a new establishment found by Mustafa Kemal Atatürk that aimed to train music teachers with respect to the new law of arts. This suggested that previous training standards had to be changed to meet Western musical standards. Musical education adopted Western musical practices as part of this new era in Turkey.

In 1934 he was appointed as the conductor of the prestigious Presidential Symphony Orchestra. That very same year Atatürk approached Saygun, asking him to write the first Turkish opera. As Saygun was a huge follower of Atatürk he accepted his offer with great warmth and in two months time finished writing the first Turkish opera, Özsoy. The opera's theme was the historical friendship between the peoples of Turkey and Iran. Following Özsoy'''s success Atatürk asked Saygun to write another opera suggesting the heroism of the Turks and Atatürk's devotion to his country and people.

Saygun quickly finished his second opera Taşbebek in that very same year. This was the year that marked Saygun's career as the musical "voice" of the newly founded republic of Turkey. He now was the musical symbol of his country and had dedicated his works and life for the people and his country, like his great admirer Atatürk.

Following the operas he was neglected in Ankara State Conservatory by its founder Paul Hindemith. He moved to Istanbul as part of the theory faculty at the Istanbul Municipal Conservatory. In 1936 Béla Bartók visited Turkey to research the native folk music. Saygun accompanied Bartók on his travels around the country, collecting and transcribing folk songs all through the Anatolia and Osmaniye (a region of Adana), Turkey. Saygun gained immense knowledge of Bartók's style of writing during this trip and learned a great deal about string quartets: they became great friends.

In 1939 he was invited back to Ankara to further promote Western musical activities and practices. A year later he formed his own organization, Ses ve Tel Birliği, which showcased recitals and concerts throughout the country, further developing public knowledge of Western classical music.

Saygun's international acclaim flourished with his oratorio Yunus Emre in 1946. This is an hour-long work written for four vocal soloists, a full chorus and full orchestra that sets a number of poems by the 13th century Anatolian mystic poet Yunus Emre. This work captures Yunus Emre's  legacy with the use of Turkish modes and folk melodies, although it is written in the post-romantic style. Since its premiere in Ankara in 1947, the oratorio has been translated into five languages and performed worldwide, including a performance in English at the United Nations led by conductor Leopold Stokowski with the NBC Symphony Orchestra in 1958. This same year he won the Stella della solidarietà and the Jean Sibelius composition awards.

The success of Yunus Emre encouraged Saygun to compose further large-scale works. In the 1950s he wrote three new operas, his first two symphonies, a piano concerto, and several pieces of chamber music pieces, of which a Paris premiere of the first string quartet (1954) and a premiere of the second string quartet (1958) in New York City performed by the Juilliard String Quartet gained him further international exposure. There followed, amongst other works, three more symphonies, concertos for violin and viola and a second piano concerto, and a third string quartet. A fourth quartet remained unfinished at his death.

Saygun was known not only as a composer but also as a scholar as he wrote and published many books on the teaching of music. He was also an ethnomusicologist and a teacher. He greatly influenced the development of western music in Turkey and helped to establish several new music conservatories, and was also a member of the National Education Council and the board of the Turkish Radio and Television Corporation. Starting in 1972, he taught composition and ethnomusicology at the Istanbul State Conservatory (later connected to the Mimar Sinan University and named "Mimar Sinan State Conservatory" in 1986). Following his death, the Ahmet Adnan Saygun Center for Music Research at Bilkent University in Ankara, Turkey, was founded where his original manuscripts and archives are also kept.

His works were played by orchestras such as NBC Symphony Orchestra, Vienna Philharmonic, Vienna Symphony Orchestra, Berlin Symphony Orchestra, Munich Philharmonic, Bavarian Radio Orchestra, NDR Radiophilharmonie Hannover and numerous others.

The German label CPO has launched a series of works in memoriam of the 100th birthday of the composer in 2007. The records are including Symphonies 1, 2, 3, 4, 5, Piano Concertos 1, 2, Violin Concerto, Viola Concerto, Cello Concerto, Anatolian Suite and String Quartets 1, 2, 3, 4.

Turkish music historian Emre Araci published a comprehensive biography and catalogue of Adnan Saygun in 2001 (Yapı Kredi Yayınları, in Turkish), based on his 1999 PhD thesis from the University of Edinburgh.

Works

Operas
Op. 9  Özsoy (one act), 1934
Op. 11 Taşbebek (one act), 1934
Op. 28 Kerem (three acts), 1947–52
Op. 52 Köroğlu (three acts, based on the Epic of Koroghlu), 1973
Op. 65 Gılgameş, 1964–1983

Ballets
Op.17 Bir Orman Masalı (A Forest Tale), 1939–43
Op.75 Kumru Efsanesi (Legend of Kumru), 1986–89

Orchestral
Op.1 Divertimento, (large orchestra with saxophone and darbuka), 1930
Op.10/b İnci's Book (Symphonic arrangement), 1944
Op.13 Magic Dance, 1934
Op.14 Suite for Orchestra, 1936
Op.24 Halay, 1943
Op.29 Symphony No. 1, 1953
Op.30 Symphony No. 2, 1958
Op.39 Symphony No. 3, 1960
Op.53 Symphony No. 4, 1974
Op.57 Ritual Dance, 1975
Op.70 Symphony No. 5, 1985
Op.72 Variations for Orchestra, 1985

Vocal/choral-orchestral
Op.3 Laments (tenor solo and male choir), 1932
Op.6 Kızılırmak Türküsü (folk song for soprano), 1933
Op.16 Masal Lied (baritone solo), 1940
Op.19 Cantata in the Old Style (soloists and chorus), 1941
Op.21 Geçen Dakikalarım (baritone solo), 1941
Op.23 Four Folk Songs, 1945
Op.26 'Yunus Emre' Oratorio, oratorio (soloists, choir, orchestra), 1942
Op.41 Ten Folk Songs, 1968
Op.54 Laments - Book II (tenor solo, male voices), 1974
Op.60 Mediations on Men I, 1977
Op.61 Mediations on Men II, 1977
Op.63 Mediations on Men III, 1983
Op.64 Mediations on Men IV, 1978
Op.66 Mediations on Men V, 1978
Op.67 Epics on Atatürk and Anatolia, 1981
Op.69 Mediations on Men VI, 1984

Concertante
Op.34 Piano Concerto No. 1, 1952–58
Op.44 Violin Concerto, 1967
Op.59 Viola Concerto, 1977
Op.71 Piano Concerto No. 2, 1985
Op.74 Cello Concerto, 1987

Chamber
Op.4 Intuitions ( two clarinets), 1933
Op.8 Percussion Quartet (clarinet, saxophone, piano, percussion), 1933
Op.12 Sonata (piano-cello), 1935
Op.20 Sonata (piano- violin), 1941
Op.27 String Quartet No.1, 1947
Op.33 Demet, Suite for violin and piano,1955
Op.35 String Quartet No.2, 1957
Op.37 Trio (oboe, clarinet, harp), 1966
Op.43 String Quartet No.3, 1966
Op.46 Wind Quintet, 1968
Op.49 Deyiş "Dictum" (strings), 1970
Op.50 Three Preludes (two harps), 1971
Op.55 Trio (oboe, clarinet, piano), 1975
Op.62 Concerto da Camera (strings), 1978
Op.68 Three Folk Songs for Four Harps, 1983
Op.78 String Quartet No.4-two movements, 1990

Instrumental
Op. 31 Partita for Cello, 1954
Op. 36 Partita for Violin, 1961

Piano
Op.2 Suite for Piano, 1931
Op.10/a İnci's Book, 1934
Op.15 Piano Sonatina, 1938
Op.25 From Anatolia, 1945
Op.38 Ten Etudes on "Aksak" Rhythms, 1964
Op.45 Twelve Preludes on "Aksak" Rhythms,1967
Op.47 Fifteen Pieces on "Aksak" Rhythms, 1967
Op.58 Ten Sketches on "Aksak" Rhythms, 1976
Op.51 Short Things, 1950–52
Op.56 Ballade (two pianos), 1975
Op.73 Poem for Three Pianos, 1986
Op.76 Piano Sonata, 1990

Choral
Op.5 Folk Song, 1933
Op.7 Çoban Armağanı, 1933
Op.18 Dağlardan Ovalardan, 1939
Op.22 Bir Tutam Kekik, 1943, last section variations on Kâtibim
Op.42 Impressions (three female voices), 1935

Vocal
Op.32 Three Ballades, 1955
Op.48 Four Melodies, 1977

See also
Turkish State Opera and Ballet
Ahmet Adnan Saygun Arts Center
 Anthology of Turkish Piano Music, Vol. I (Sheet Music)
 Anthology of Turkish Piano Music, Vol. II (Sheet Music)
 Anthology of Turkish Piano Music, Vol. III (Sheet Music)

References

 Anon. [n.d.]. "Ahmed Adnan Saygun" (Bilkent University Faculty of Music and Performing Arts)
 Burton, Anthony. 2002. "Saygun, A. Adnan." In The Oxford Companion to Music, edited by Alison Latham. Oxford Music Online,  (accessed February 26, 2009). (Subscription access)
 Orga, Ateş. [2006]. "Ahmed Adnan SAYGUN (1907-1991): Complete String Quartets" (review). Music Web International.

Further reading
 Araci, Emre. 1997. "Reforming Zeal". The Musical Times 138, no. 1855 (September): 12–15.
 Aydin, Yilmaz (2002). Die Werke der 'Türkischen Fünf' im Lichte der Musikalischen Wechselbeziehungen zwischen der Türkei und Europa. Europäische Hochshculschriften, Peter Lang Publisher.
 Miller, Philip L., and Franklin B. Zimmerman. 1959. "Current Chronicle: United States: New York". The Musical Quarterly 45, no. 1 (January): 88–95.
 Weldon, George. 1951. "Music in Turkey". Tempo, New Series, no. 20 (Summer): 29–30.
 Woodard, Kathryn. 2007. “Music Mediating Politics in Turkey: The Case of Ahmed Adnan Saygun” Comparative Studies of South Asia, Africa and the Middle East Vol. 27, No. 3, 552-562.
 Zimmerman, Franklin B. 1959. "Reports from Abroad: New York". The Musical Times'' 100, no. 1392 (February): 99.

External links
Catalog from JPC
Saygun Piano Music from Albany Records

1907 births
1991 deaths
People from İzmir
The Turkish Five
Turkish opera composers
Ballet composers
State Artists of Turkey
20th-century classical composers
Turkish classical composers
Schola Cantorum de Paris alumni
Male classical composers
20th-century male musicians
Academic staff of Ankara State Conservatory